Deha Bozkan (born January 1, 1989 in Manisa) is a Turkish volleyball player. He is 181 cm. He plays for Fenerbahçe Men's Volleyball Team since 2005 and wear 2 number. He played 5 times for national team. He also played for Manisa Belediyespor and Salihli Belediyespor.

External links
 Player profile at fenerbahce.org

1989 births
Living people
Sportspeople from Manisa
Turkish men's volleyball players
Fenerbahçe volleyballers
Manisa Belediyespor volleyballers
Salihli Belediyespor volleyballers
21st-century Turkish people